Warren Sattler (born September 7, 1934) is an American artist and cartoonist, who contributed work to many popular publications from the early 1960s through the 1990s.

Biography
A lifelong Connecticut resident, Warren Sattler started cartooning at an early age and was first published in a newspaper at age 15. He got his education at the Wilcox Technical School in Meriden, Connecticut. He later taught at the Famous Artists School from 1957 to 1962. In the 1960s, he assisted on the comic strips Barnaby and The Jackson Twins. Sattler also drew comics that appeared in Help magazine under the direction of Harvey Kurtzman. His own strip, Grubby, ran from 1964 to 1997 (syndicated by the Al Smith Service).

In the 1970s, Sattler produced art for comic books, in particular Charlton Comics. Some titles he worked on include Billy the Kid, Fightin' Army, Fightin' Marines, Ghost Manor, Ghostly Haunts, and Yang. Additionally, he worked as an illustrator for Cracked magazine, National Lampoon, and Playboy. Sattler created a second syndicated comic strip in 1980: Swamp Brats, a Sunday-only strip. He ghosted on such newspaper strips as Bringing Up Father, Comics for Kids and Gil Thorp during the 1980s and 1990s.

Personal life 
Sattler and his wife Margaret had five children:  Steve, Marc, Craig, Casey, and Cindy.

Awards
In 2003, he was inducted into the Meriden Hall of Fame.

Notes

References
Who's Who of American Comic Books

American illustrators
20th-century American painters
American male painters
21st-century American painters
Living people
Artists from Connecticut
1934 births
People from Meriden, Connecticut
20th-century American male artists